Dorian Andrew Mientjez Yates (born 19 April 1962) is an English retired professional bodybuilder. He won the Mr. Olympia title six consecutive times from 1992 to 1997 and has the fifth-highest number of Mr. Olympia wins in history, ranking behind Ronnie Coleman (8), Lee Haney (8), Arnold Schwarzenegger (7), and Phil Heath (7). He is widely considered to be one of the top pro bodybuilders in history, and was well known for his high intensity training, top-level conditioning, and his wide, thick back.

Early life
Dorian Andrew Mientjez Yates was born on 19 April 1962, in Solihull, then in Warwickshire, England. He grew up on a farm in Hurley, rural Warwickshire. Yates's father died of a heart attack when he was 13. He, his mother and his sister then moved to Walmley in Sutton Coldfield. As a professional bodybuilder, Yates lived in the Ladywood and Castle Vale areas of Birmingham.

When Yates was 18, he and his friends were arrested while crossing Birmingham to get to a party. One day after the 1981 Birmingham city centre riots, they claimed to have come across a partially broken shop window, when one of Yates's friends attempted to steal a hat off of a mannequin, it had fallen, smashing the rest of the shop window in the process. Each of them received 6 months at Whatton Youth Detention Centre, where Yates would take up weight training.

Career
Yates started working out in 1983 at Martin's Gym, the original bodybuilding gym located in Temple Row, Birmingham. During this time he won the 1984 Mr. Birmingham as a novice and in 1986 became the British Champion at Heavyweight for the first time.  
                                   
His professional record consists of 15 major contest wins and two second-place finishes; from 1992 to his retirement in 1997 he won every single contest he entered. His career ended in large part due to chronic acute injuries, including torn biceps and triceps, the latter just three weeks prior to his final contest, the 1997 Mr. Olympia, which he won in spite of the injury; his win generated controversy among fellow athletes, critics, and amateurs, who thought the runner-up Nasser El Sonbaty deserved to win.

Yates was a proponent of Arthur Jones and Mike Mentzer's high-intensity training (HIT) style of bodybuilding, which poses that maximum muscle stimulation can be reached through short and intense workout sessions instead of long and slow ones. He earned the nickname "The Shadow" coined by Peter McGough for his tendency to unexpectedly appear at major bodybuilding contests and steal the win, having neither confirmed nor denied whether he would compete beforehand, and for spending most of his time between contests avoiding the public eye.

Yates is considered to be the first of the "mass monsters" in bodybuilding. He combined his enormous muscle mass along with peak conditioning, quoted as being "granite hardness". He believes that his injuries are due to his habit of maintaining an extreme level of training intensity all year long, even when approaching contests, while being on a severely restricted "cutting" diet which weakens the body overall. Regarding the use of PEDs, he referenced the documentary Super Size Me and stated that eating three McDonald's meals a day is more harmful for the metabolism than his 12 years of regular steroid use.

Post-competition career

In 1987, Yates purchased Temple Gym, located on Temple Street in Birmingham. In 2006, he franchised four additional Temple Gym locations, three of which are in the UK. As of 2020, only the original Birmingham gym is still in operation. The Birmingham gym has now relocated from Temple Street to the city's jewellery quarter.

Yates formed the California-based company Heavy Duty Inc. in 1994 with Mike Mentzer and Ray Mentzer. The company marketed athletic apparel and bodybuilding-related books.

In 1998, Yates partnered with Kerry Kayes to form the bodybuilding supplement company CNP Professional, which marketed a Dorian Yates Approved product line in the U.S. He left the company in 2006 to form his own company, Dorian Yates Ultimate Formulas, which offers a line of protein and weight-gain supplements. He started a second company in 2010, EU Peptides, which sells peptide hormones and other pro-hormone supplements. He left EU Peptides in 2012. In 2011, Yates founded a third company, DY Nutrition, which specializes in pre-workout formulas and has released several training DVDs.

DY Nutrition is a line of supplements that consists of whey protein supplements, pre-workout, and post-workout supplements owned and endorsed by Yates.

Personal life
Yates now lives in Spain. He is married to Brazilian fitness model Glauce "Gal" Ferreira, who won the IFBB South American Bodyfitness event and was also the 2007 IFBB World Bodyfitness Champion. They had met at the 2008 Arnold Classic, and live in Marbella. Yates's son from his ex-wife Deb, Lewis, has also taken up bodybuilding and works closely with his father.

Yates has described yoga and meditation as a life altering experience. He does yoga on a daily basis.

Yates has made statements in interviews concerning the negative health effects of sodium fluoride additives in tap water and claimed that there are cancer viruses and sterilants in some vaccines. He has endorsed the use of some psychedelic entheogens for religious and spiritual purposes, including ayahuasca. Yates is also open about his use of cannabis which began before his bodybuilding career; he has been an advocate for cannabis use and legalisation since the late 2000's due to its relaxing properties, temporary increases in respiratory capacity, and claimed anti-cancer properties - among other things.

Stats
Height: 175 cm Competition Weight:  Chest size: Hip size: Thigh Size:  Waist Size: Calf Size:  Upper Arm Size: '''

Bodybuilding titles
1984 Mr Birmingham Novice, 1st 
1985 World Games, 7th Heavyweights
1986 British Championships, 1st Heavyweight
1988 British Championships, 1st Heavyweight and overall
1990 Night of Champions, 2nd
1991 Night of Champions, 1st
1991 Mr. Olympia, 2nd
1991 English Grand Prix, 1st
1992 Mr. Olympia, 1st
1992 English Grand Prix, 1st
1993 Mr. Olympia, 1st
1994 Mr. Olympia, 1st
1994 Spanish Grand Prix, 1st
1994 German Grand Prix, 1st
1994 English Grand Prix, 1st
1995 Mr. Olympia, 1st
1996 Mr. Olympia, 1st
1996 Spanish Grand Prix, 1st
1996 German Grand Prix, 1st
1996 English Grand Prix, 1st
1997 Mr. Olympia, 1st

References

External links
DorianYates.net
Dorian Yates on Facebook
Dorian Yates on Twitter
Dorian Yates  The Making of the Super Bodybuilder
Dorian Yates Instagram

1962 births
Living people
People from Sutton Coldfield
Professional bodybuilders
English bodybuilders
British bodybuilders
English expatriates in Spain